Flash is a 2007 Indian Malayalam-language psychological crime thriller film, directed by Sibi Malayil and written by S. Bhasurachandran. It was produced and distributed by Tomichan Mulakuppadam. The film stars Mohanlal, Indrajith Sukumaran and Parvathy Thiruvothu. The plot revolves around Dhwani, who has to go through some harrowing experiences, and her big, joint family. Flash was released on 25 December 2007.

Plot 
Priyan is a software engineer working with Dr. Mithun, a Mumbai-based Information Technology industrialist. Dr. Mithun Madhavan is a psychiatrist in reality. Priyan is in love with his uncle's daughter Dhwani who was brought up in Chennai. The story deals with the disturbing events in Dhwani's life and how Dr. Mithun helps her overcome those.

Cast 

Mohanlal as Dr. Mithun Madhavan, psychiatrist
Parvathy Thiruvothu as Dhwani, a Chennai-born Malayali girl
Indrajith Sukumaran as Priyan, a software engineer
Jagathy Sreekumar as "Idea" Sasi
Shamna Kasim as Dhwani's friend
Ponvannan as Muthashan
Sai Kumar as Menon
Siddique as CI of Police Jacob Chandy
Susheelan as IG KRD Nambiar(voice dubbed)
Manikuttan 
Suresh Krishna as Bhadran
P. Sreekumar as N.R.B
Vineeth Kumar as Arunkumar
Biyon as Balu
Suraj Venjaramoodu as Vaidyar
Bijukuttan as Assistant to Vaidyar
Ambika Mohan as Dhwani's kin
Lakshmipriya as Dhwani's kin
Nisha Sarang as Dhwani's kin
Sreelatha Namboothiri  as Dhwani's kin
Indulekha as Receptionist
Cherthala Lalitha
Parvati Melton as Mithun's wife (Cameo appearance)

Production 
The film was produced by Tomichan Mulakuppadam, under the banner of Mulakuppadam Films. The filming locations include Kozhikode, Kanhangad, and Kuala Lumpur.

Music

The soundtrack of the film was composed by Gopi Sundar. The album features five songs which has been written by Rafeeq Ahamed.

References

External links 
 

2000s Malayalam-language films
2007 films
Films directed by Sibi Malayil
Indian crime thriller films
Indian psychological films
Films shot in Kozhikode
Films shot in Chennai
Films shot in Kuala Lumpur
2007 thriller films